Don Rose (1934–2005) was an American radio personality.

Don Rose may also refer to:

Don Rose (baseball) (born 1947), American professional baseball player
Don Rose, record label executive for Rykodisc

See also
Donald Frank Rose (1890–1964), American newspaper columnist and author